The Buffalo Bandits are a lacrosse team based in Buffalo, New York playing in the National Lacrosse League (NLL). The 2011 season was their twentieth season in the NLL. The Bandits finished tied with the Toronto Rock and Rochester Knighthawks with the best record in the East, but were awarded first place due to tiebreakers. After defeating the Boston Blazers in the Division Semifinals, the Bandits lost to the eventual champion Toronto Rock in the Division Finals. The Bandits were led by Mark Steenhuis, who scored 36 goals and had 54 assists on the year.

Standings

Game log
Reference:

Playoffs

Game log
Reference:

Transactions

Trades

Entry draft
The 2010 NLL Entry Draft took place on September 8, 2010. The Bandits selected the following players:

 Minnesota traded their 13th overall pick and their third round pick in 2011 to for both Buffalo's 15th and 27th overall picks.
 Toronto traded their 60th overall pick for Buffalo's sixth round pick in 2011.

Roster

See also
2011 NLL season

References

Buffalo
Buffalo Bandits seasons
Buffalo Bandits